Aidan Morris (born November 16, 2001) is an American professional soccer player who plays as a midfielder for the Columbus Crew in Major League Soccer.

Youth career 
Originally from Florida, Morris was recruited to Columbus Crew SC Academy, where he played from 2017 to 2019. He attended Indiana University in 2019, where he played college soccer. He scored his first collegiate goal on October 1, 2019 against Northwestern. Morris was named Big Ten Offensive Player of the Week on October 8 and October 29. He was named Big Ten Freshman of the Year and won the 2019 TopDrawerSoccer.com National Freshman of the Year Award, a national award given to the top freshman college soccer player in the United States. After his only college season, Morris signed as a homegrown player for the Columbus Crew

Professional career

Columbus Crew

2020 season 
Morris was announced as a homegrown player signing by the Columbus Crew on January 14, 2020. He made his professional debut in a July 11 match during the MLS is Back Tournament, coming on late in a 4–0 trouncing of in-state rival FC Cincinnati. He made his second appearance for the Crew on July 16, coming off the bench for an injured Darlington Nagbe in the 67th minute of a 2–0 win against New York Red Bulls. He made his first start for the Crew in October 2020. Overall, Morris made eleven appearances for the Crew during the 2020 MLS season. To cap off the season, on December 12, 2020 he became the youngest player in league history to start in MLS Cup as he helped guide the Crew to a 3–0 win over the Seattle Sounders.

2021 season 
Morris started the first game of the 2021 season for the Crew, a 4–0 win against Real Estelí in the round of 16 of the CONCACAF Champions League. Morris again started the second leg against Real Esteli, however, he left the game in the fourth minute of what was a 1–0 victory for Columbus with an ACL injury that sidelined him for the entirety of the 2021 MLS season.

International career
Morris was called up to the United States national under-20 soccer team in January 2020.

Career statistics

Club

International

Honors
Indiana University
Top Drawer Soccer Freshman of the Year: 2019
Big Ten Men's Soccer Tournament Champion: 2019

Columbus Crew
MLS Cup: 2020

References

External links 
 Aidan Morris at Indiana Athletics

Living people
2001 births
American soccer players
Indiana Hoosiers men's soccer players
People from Franklin County, Ohio
Soccer players from Florida
Soccer players from Ohio
United States men's under-20 international soccer players
Major League Soccer players
Columbus Crew players
Homegrown Players (MLS)
Association football midfielders
Columbus Crew 2 players
MLS Next Pro players
United States men's international soccer players